|}

The Flying Scotsman Stakes is a Listed flat horse race in Great Britain open to horses aged two years old. It is run at Doncaster Racecourse over a distance of 7 furlongs and 6 yards (1,408 metres), and it is scheduled to take place each year in September.

Prior to 2013 the race was known as the Frank Whittle Partnership Conditions Stakes, and amongst its earlier winners was Frankel in 2010. From 1983 to 1999 the race was known as the Queen's Own Yorkshire Dragoons Conditions Stakes.  In 2013 it was upgraded to Listed status, replacing Goodwood's Stardom Stakes in the calendar and at the same time it was renamed the Flying Scotsman Stakes in honour of the LNER Class A3 4472 Flying Scotsman, a locomotive which was built at Doncaster Works 90 years previously in 1923. The race is currently held on the third day of Doncaster's four-day St. Leger Festival meeting.

Records
Leading jockey since 1983 (5 wins):
 Frankie Dettori – Prussian Flag (1994), Benny The Dip (1996), Librettist (2004), Al Zir (2009), New Mandate (2020)

Leading trainer since 1983 (5 wins):
 Michael Stoute – Shaadi (1988), Ezzoud (1991), Tough Speed (1999), City of Troy (2005), Sangarius (2018)

Winners since 1983

See also
 Horse racing in Great Britain
 List of British flat horse races

References

 Paris-Turf: 
 Racing Post:
, 

Flat races in Great Britain
Doncaster Racecourse
Flat horse races for two-year-olds